John Giheno,    (1949 – 20 March 2017) was a Papua New Guinea politician and government minister. Giheno served as acting Prime Minister of Papua New Guinea from March 27, 1997, until June 2, 1997, following the resignation of then Prime Minister Julius Chan.

Prime Minister Julius Chan resigned on March 27, 1997, following a scandal regarding the hiring of foreign mercenaries to fight rebels on the island of Bougainville. The use of mercenaries by the Chan government resulted in a Papua New Guinea Defence Force mutiny codenamed 'Operasen Rausim Kwik' and riots in Bougainville. Chan stated that he resigned to preserve peace in Papua New Guinea.

The Cabinet chose John Giheno, who was serving as the mining and petroleum Minister at the time, as acting Prime Minister until new elections could be held. Giheno served as Prime Minister as a caretaker until new elections could be held in June 1997. Sixteen government ministers in the Chan government, including both Giheno and Chan, lost their seats in Parliament in the June 1997 general elections.

In the 1996 New Years Honours List he was appointed a Companion of the Order of St Michael and St George (CMG).

References

1949 births
2017 deaths
Prime Ministers of Papua New Guinea
Government ministers of Papua New Guinea
Members of the National Parliament of Papua New Guinea
People's Progress Party politicians